Wiaga is a town in the Builsa District of the Upper East Region of Ghana.

References

Populated places in the Upper East Region